Sæther is a Norwegian surname. Notable people with the surname include:

 Andrine Sæther (born 1964), Norwegian actress
 Bjarne Berg-Sæther (1919–2009), Norwegian politician for the Labour Party
 Gjøran Sæther (born 1982), Norwegian artist and painter
 Harald Sæther (born 1946), Norwegian composer
 Jan Valentin Sæther (born 1944), Norwegian figurative painter, sculptor and Gnosticism priest
 Morten Sæther (born 1959), Norwegian cyclist
 Ole Sæther (1870-1946), Norwegian rifle shooter
 Olaf Sæther (1872-1945), Norwegian rifle shooter
 Peder Sæther (1810-1886), Norwegian-American banker
 Svein Ole Sæther (born 1948), Norwegian diplomat
 Wera Sæther (born 1945), Norwegian psychologist and writer

Norwegian-language surnames